Achyrolimonia is a genus of crane fly in the family Limoniidae.

Species
A. alcestis (Alexander, 1978)
A. atrichoptera (Alexander, 1930)
A. basispina (Alexander, 1924)
A. bequaerti (Alexander, 1930)
A. bisalba (Alexander, 1961)
A. brunneilata (Alexander, 1959)
A. claggi (Alexander, 1931)
A. coeiana (Nielsen, 1959)
A. corinna (Alexander, 1951)
A. cuthbertsoni (Alexander, 1934)
A. decemmaculata (Loew, 1873)
A. galactopoda (Alexander, 1961)
A. holotricha (Alexander, 1926)
A. immerens (Alexander, 1963)
A. leucocnemis (Alexander, 1956)
A. millotiana (Alexander, 1959)
A. monacantha (Alexander, 1924)
A. neonebulosa (Alexander, 1924)
A. perarcuata (Alexander, 1976)
A. persuffusa (Alexander, 1956)
A. pothos (Alexander, 1957)
A. potnia (Alexander, 1957)
A. protrusa (Alexander, 1936)
A. recedens (Alexander, 1920)
A. recurvans (Alexander, 1919)
A. saucroptera (Alexander, 1957)
A. staneri (Alexander, 1956)
A. synchaeta (Alexander, 1931)
A. trichoptera (Alexander, 1920)
A. trigonella (Alexander, 1932)
A. trigonia (Edwards, 1919)
A. trigonoides (Alexander, 1927)
A. venustipennis (Alexander, 1921)

References

Limoniidae
Articles containing video clips
Tipuloidea genera